Fuschi is an Italian surname, a variant of the surname Fusco. It may refer to

People
Michael of Cesena, an Italian Franciscan, general of that Order and theologian, also known as Michele Fuschi
Olegna Fuschi, an American musician and former director of the pre-college division at Juilliard
Rick Fuschi, a Canadian politician

Places
Fuschi, a contrado (village) of Morcone in Italy

Italian-language surnames